John Francis McGrath may refer to:
John McGrath (New South Wales politician) (1893–1971)
John McGrath (Victorian politician) (1939–2021)